Events from the year 1618 in Quebec.

Events
In a memoria to king Louis XIII, Samuel de Champlain proposes that the French should start to convert the First Nations in North America. This marks the start of a process that will have wide-reaching consequences in the colony.
Jean Nicolet arrives in Quebec. Like Étienne Brûlé before him, Nicolet is sent to live among the natives in order to learn their language and function as a link between them and the French colonists. Nicolet settles among the Algonquins on Allumette island in the Ottawa River.

Births
Médard des Groseilliers, explorer and coureur des bois (d. 1696).
January 4 - Guillaume Couture, diplomat in New France (d. 1701).

Deaths

References

1610s in Canada
Quebec, 1618 In
Years in Quebec